"Tsubame Kurimuzon" is a single by the Japanese rock band Nothing's Carved in Stone released on December 18, 2013.

Track listing

References 

2013 singles
2013 songs